Antonie Brentano (28 May 1780 in Vienna – 12 May 1869 in Frankfurt), born Johanna Antonie Josefa Edle von Birkenstock, known as Toni, was a philanthropist, art collector, arts patron, and close friend of Beethoven, being the dedicatee of his "Diabelli" variations.

Early life
Antonie was the daughter of Austrian diplomat, educational reformer, and art collector Johann Melchior Edler von Birkenstock (1738–1809) and his wife Carolina Josefa von Hay (born 1755 in Fulnek/Böhmen; died 18 May 1788 in Vienna). She had three siblings, two of whom died in infancy:

 Hugo Konrad Gottfried von Birkenstock (15 December 1778 in Vienna – 10 April 1825 in Ybbs an der Donau). Lieutenant in the k.u.k. Weydenfeld-Infantry
 Konstantin Viktor von Birkenstock (born and died 1782 in Frankfurt)
 Johann Eduard Valentin von Birkenstock (born and died 1784 in Frankfurt)

Her father was an Imperial advisor to Empress Maria Theresa and the reformist Emperor Joseph II. Through his wife, he was the brother-in-law of Joseph von Sonnenfels, the dedicatee of Beethoven's Piano Sonata in D-Major Op. 28 (1802). Antonie von Birkenstock Brentano's mother was the sister of the Reformbischofs of Königgrätz Jan Leopold Ritter von Hay (1735–1794).

From 1782 until approximately 1784, the Birkenstock family lived in Frankfurt-am-Main, where Antonie's brothers Konstantin Viktor and Johann Eduard von Birkenstock were born and died in infancy. It is possible that Johann Melchior von Birkenstock became acquainted with the Brentano family at this time. In Vienna, the family lived in a forty-room mansion in the city's central Landstraße district, located at Erdberggasse Nr. 98 (today, Erdbergstraße 19), which housed a large library and Birkenstock's sizable art collection.

Ten days before her eighth birthday, Antonie lost her mother to an epidemic and was sent to school at the Ursuline convent in Pressburg.

Marriage and children
In September 1797, prosperous Frankfurt merchant Franz Brentano (1765–1844), the half-brother of authors Clemens Brentano (1778–1842) and Bettina von Arnim (1785–1859), sent his half-sister, Sophie Brentano (1776–1800), and his stepmother Friederike Brentano née von Rottenhof (1771–1817) to Vienna to meet Antonie. Franz had met Antonie briefly at the end of 1796 or beginning of 1797. After a long negotiation with Antonie's father, Franz and Antonie were wed on 23 July 1798 at St. Stephen's Cathedral in Vienna. Eight days after the wedding, the pair departed Vienna for Frankfurt-am-Main. Antonie and Franz had six children:

 Mathilde (3 July 1799 in Frankfurt am Main – 5 April 1800).
 Georg Franz Melchior (13 January 1801 in Frankfurt am Main – 1 March 1853), married on 5 January 1835 to Lilla Pfeifer (1813–1868).
 Maximiliane Euphrosine Kunigunde (8 November 1802 in Frankfurt am Main – 1 September 1861, Brunnen, Switzerland), on 30 December 1825 married Friedrich Landolin Karl von Blittersdorf (1792–1861). Beethoven composed a piano, violin and cello trio for her. "Beethoven never submitted Allegretto for Piano Trio for publication, perhaps because it was too casual in nature. He wrote it for his 10-year-old piano student, Maxe Brentano, and affixed a note, “for my little friend to encourage her in piano playing. LvB.”".
 Josefa Ludovica (29 June 1804 in Frankfurt am Main – 2 February 1875), on 28 May 1832 married Anton Theodor Brentano-Tozza (1809–1895).
 Franziska Elisabeth, known as Fanny (26 June 1806 in Frankfurt am Main – 16 October 1837), in 1836 married Johann Baptist Josef Reuss.
 Karl Josef (8 March 1813 in Frankfurt am Main – 18 May 1850).

Vienna years
In August 1809, Antonie returned to Vienna to care for her ailing father, who died on October 30, 1809. After his death, Antonie remained in Vienna for three years to sort out her father's art collection and supervise its sale. Franz Brentano established a branch of his business in Vienna and joined his wife there. Bettina von Arnim, in her epistolary novel Goethe's Correspondence with a Child, describes Birkenstock's collection as follows:  
The Brentano family made the acquaintance of Beethoven and Goethe at this time, in 1810 and 1812 respectively, Beethoven subsequently becoming a close family friend and a regular visitor to the Brentano home while the family was still in Vienna. He later dedicated one of his most accomplished works, the Diabelli Variations, to Antonie and two more, including his antepenultimate piano sonata, to her daughter Maximiliane.

Immortal Beloved candidacy

American psychologist Maynard Solomon, in his 1977 biography of Beethoven, set forth numerous arguments favouring Antonie Brentano as the intended recipient of Beethoven's "Immortal Beloved" letter, listing the known facts supporting his belief that Brentano and Beethoven had become intimately involved by the summer of 1812. Despite success in leading many Beethoven scholars to accept his hypothesis as fact, Solomon wrote, "clearly, there is no possibility of absolute certainty here, and the researcher should not exclude even the most remote possibilities". Leaving open the possibility that contradictory evidence may surface in the future, Solomon, refuted by some scholars and still supported by others, maintains that after 42 years of intervening research the most likely candidate for Beethoven's Immortal Beloved remains Antonie Brentano. His detractors are content to note that Antonie was not only married but most likely pregnant at the time of the alleged 1812 Karlsbad assignation, and Beethoven, by his own admission, faithful friend of herself, her children and her husband, was an entirely honourable man.

Charitable work
After the Brentanos returned from Vienna, Franz was elected a senator of Frankfurt (1816). Antonie was known as "the mother of the poor" for her work in raising funds for the poor and disenfranchised citizens of Frankfurt. She founded and ran several charities. Antonie was also one of the foremost cultural figures in Frankfurt and helped to establish a salon society there. The Brentanos entertained notables such as Goethe and the brothers Grimm both at their house in Frankfurt and at their summer home, Winkel near Rheingau.

Notes

Further reading
 Andreas Niedermayer, Frau Schöff Johanna Antonia Brentano. Ein Lebensbild, Frankfurt 1869
 Goethes Briefwechsel mit Antonie Brentano 1814–1821, ed. Rudolf Jung, Weimar 1896
 Gail S. Altman, Beethoven: A Man of His Word - Undisclosed Evidence for his Immortal Beloved  (Anubian Press, 1998)
 Max Unger, Auf Spuren von Beethovens „Unsterblicher Geliebten“, Langensalza 1911
 Hermine Cloeter, Das Brentano-Haus in Wien, in: dies., Zwischen Gestern und Heute. Wanderungen durch Wien und den Wienerwald, Wien 1918, pp. 148–162
 Peter Anton von Brentano di Tremezzo, Stammreihen der Brentano mit Abriß der Familiengeschichte, Bad Reichenhall 1933
 Maria Andrea Goldmann, Antonia Brentano, die Frau Schöff, in: Goldmann, Im Schatten des Kaiserdomes. Frauenbilder, Limburg 1938, pp. 69–163
 Jean and Brigitte Massin: Ludwig van Beethoven, Paris 1955
 Maynard Solomon, New light on Beethoven's letter to an unknown woman, in: The Musical Quarterly, Vol. 58 (1972), pp. 572–587
 Maynard Solomon, "Antonie Brentano and Beethoven", in:  "Music and Letters", Vol. 58, no 2 (1977): pp. 153–169.
 Maynard Solomon, "Beethoven", second revised edition, chapter 15 entitled "The Immortal Beloved", published 2001 by Schirmer Trade Books.
 Harry Goldschmidt, Um die Unsterbliche Geliebte, Leipzig: Deutscher Verlag für Musik 1977
 Virginia Oakley Beahrs, "The Immortal Beloved Riddle Reconsidered." in: Musical Times, Vol. 129, No. 1740 (Feb. 1988), .
 Marie-Elisabeth Tellenbach, Psychoanalysis and the Historiocritical Method: On Maynard Solomon‘s Image of Beethoven, in: The Beethoven Newsletter 8/3 (1993/1994), ; 9/3, 
 Klaus Martin Kopitz, Antonie Brentano in Wien (1809–1812). Neue Quellen zur Problematik „Unsterbliche Geliebte“, in: Bonner Beethoven-Studien, Band 2 (2001), klaus-martin-kopitz.de (PDF)
 Klaus Martin Kopitz, Antonie Brentano, in: Das Beethoven-Lexikon, edit. by Heinz von Loesch and Claus Raab, Laaber 2008, .

External links
 Baron von Brentano, Brentanohaus in Winkel im Rheingau

1780 births
1869 deaths
Philanthropists from Vienna
Burials at Frankfurt Main Cemetery
19th-century philanthropists
Edlers of Austria